Solar Power is the third studio album by New Zealand singer-songwriter Lorde. It was released on 20 August 2021, by Universal Music New Zealand. Lorde wrote and produced the album with American musician Jack Antonoff, with whom she also worked on her second studio album, Melodrama (2017).

The album was preceded by Going South, a June 2021 memoir documenting Lorde's 2019 visit to Antarctica, which she dubbed as the precursor to the album. She stated the title Solar Power was inspired by the trip, and that she "felt like [she] could just chill out and flex a little bit" while creating the record. Three singles were released before the album: the lead single and title track, "Solar Power", was released on a solar eclipse and entered the charts in various countries, reaching number two on the New Zealand Singles Chart. It was followed by "Stoned at the Nail Salon" and "Mood Ring", leading up to the album's release.

Classified by Lorde as her "weed album", Solar Power is a psychedelic pop and indie folk effort driven by acoustic guitar arrangements, marking a departure from the synth-heavy, dance-oriented music of her previous works. The album's lyrics revolve around solipsism and summer escapism, mainly focusing on Lorde's leisure time in her homeland New Zealand, simultaneously expressing her disdain for fame and celebrity culture. Solar Power was met with polarised reviews from music critics, who admired Lorde's matured vocals, but were divided over its songwriting; some reviewers praised the laid-back music and perceptive themes, while others considered its sound unfinished and lyrics dispassionate. Lorde later described the response to the record as "really confounding," and "painful".

Commercially, Solar Power reached number one in Australia and New Zealand, and charted inside the top-10 in Austria, Belgium, Canada, the Netherlands, Germany, Ireland, Portugal, Spain, Sweden, Scotland, Switzerland, the United Kingdom, and the United States. It additionally topped the US Billboard Alternative Albums chart. Lorde opted against manufacturing CDs for environmental reasons, releasing Solar Power to digital music platforms, streaming services, and as vinyl LPs only. A Māori-language EP, titled Te Ao Mārama, was released on 9 September 2021 as a companion project to Solar Power. It consists of the Māori versions of five tracks from the album. To promote the album, Lorde embarked on her third concert tour, the Solar Power Tour, visiting North America, Latin America, Europe, and Oceania.

Background and recording
On 16 June 2017, Lorde released her second studio album, Melodrama, to universal critical acclaim. It topped several year-end best albums lists by music critics, but trailed commercially compared to her debut studio album, Pure Heroine. It was nominated for the Grammy Award for Album of the Year at the 60th Annual Grammy Awards. In November 2018, Lorde revealed to fans in a newsletter that she had been learning the piano and expected her third album to be "born out of" the instrument; however, she also divulged that despite this she hadn't "started properly on the next record yet" and was unsure as to when it would be completed. On the second anniversary of Melodramas release, Lorde confirmed to fans on Instagram that the album was "in the oven," and she also revealed that she had taken up bread baking and adopted a dog and a cat.

The singer made her first public performance following the conclusion of her Melodrama World Tour in April 2019 at a benefit concert for victims of the Christchurch mosque shootings, which had occurred the previous month. Later that year, Lorde disclosed that the album release would be postponed indefinitely following the death of her dog Pearl, who had been suffering from various illnesses; she explained that the dog had been an important part of the creative process of the record and that "it's going to take some time and re-calibration, now that there's no shepherd ahead of [her], to see what the work is going to be." She added that the album would not "be the same work" due to the impact of Pearl's death, writing: "When this great loss crystallises inside me, and my chest rebuilds around it, hopefully I'll be able to finish up, and share it with you, and we'll all grow together, as we always do."

In an interview with Triple J in March 2020, Lorde revealed that she had been working on "bits and pieces" that were "starting to take a very exciting shape," but added that she still had "no idea when things will happen." When asked whether she had been working on new material in separate interview the following month, she replied that "it's been a very productive year." That May, the singer wrote in a newsletter that she had returned to the studio in the previous December and recorded music with Jack Antonoff, whom she collaborated with on Melodrama. She added that, due to the COVID-19 pandemic, the two were working remotely. Malay also disclosed that he had been heavily involved in the creation of her third album.

In an August 2021 interview for The New York Times, Lorde stated: "I haven't made a Jack Antonoff record, I've made a Lorde record and he's helped me make it and very much deferred to me on production and arrangement". She also said she used only a single 808 drum machine in the entire album, and that "there's definitely not a smash [...] because I don't even know really what the smashes are now", commenting on the commercial prospects of Solar Power, in which she "felt like I could just chill out and flex a little bit." She also stated in the interview that she was influenced by Pilgrim at Tinker Creek by Annie Dillard and How to Do Nothing by Jenny Odell. She described the album's opening track, "The Path", as "a sort of thesis statement for the album".

Cover artwork
In an interview with Stephen Colbert, Lorde revealed that the album cover was photographed by her friend Ophelia Mikkelson Jones on the beach while she jumped over her. Colbert could not show the cover on TV, with Lorde saying that it is "a little hardcore, but it was so joyful to me" and "a little bit feral". In some markets, including mainland China, Hong Kong, Japan, Saudi Arabia, and the United Arab Emirates, Lorde's buttocks are censored by a bright sunlight lens flare.

Music and lyrics 
Critics described Solar Power as an indie folk, folk-pop, and psychedelic record, specifically the psychedelic folk and psychedelic pop styles. It emphasises guitars, usually acoustic, complemented by soft rock and electronic elements. Eschewing the prominent 808s, dance, and synth-focused sounds of Lorde's past works, Solar Power opts for a more "organic", "earthier", unplugged sound, with stripped-down arrangements, unpredictable chord progressions, sparse percussions, and minimal drums. The album's subject matter expresses escapism, retrospection, introspection, and solipsism, discussing topics like social life, celebrity culture, grief, climate crisis, and reconnection with nature. In an interview with Viva Magazine, Lorde said on the topic of being naff that "That’s my biggest achievement with this album and I feel like no one got it. I say, ‘Let the bliss begin.’ I say a lot of crazy naff shit on this album."

In a newsletter published in June 2022, Lorde wrote that she agreed with a friend who said that "it’s clearly one of those works that gets made between peaks, the kind that’s necessary for makers sometimes, no less precious, in fact, there can’t be peaks at all without such works."

Songs 
The album's first track, "The Path", features "dark and moody flute melodies" beneath Lorde's vocals, with the line "if you're looking for a savior, that's not me" directed to her fans. The song also addresses themes of the pressures of fame, with the lyric of "teen millionaire having nightmares from the camera flash," and incorporates direct references to star-studded moments of Lorde's career, namely her attendance at the 2016 Met Gala. Musically, "The Path" is set in the key of F major with a tempo of 92 beats per minute. After the title track, the third song on Solar Power is "California", which begins with a reference to Lorde's hit single "Royals" being awarded the Grammy for Song of the Year by Carole King in 2014. The Daily Telegraph called "California" a "a playful goodbye to Hollywood," while Lorde claimed it as the song she was most excited to dance to on tour in a July 2021 interview. The Mamas & the Papas also served as a direct melodic reference when inventing the song.

Lorde began writing the fourth track and second single off the album, "Stoned at the Nail Salon," roughly six months after finishing her Melodrama World Tour, and later recorded it in Antonoff's home studio. A contemplative folk ballad, Lorde said in an email to fans the song was borne out of insecure feelings of fading into irrelevance and becoming out of touch with pop culture; "I was sure that I was building a beautiful life for myself, but I wasn’t sure if that life was going to satisfy the same thirsty, fearless person who could tear apart a festival stage or be in seven countries in seven days." Track five on the album is "Fallen Fruit", which Laura Snapes of The Guardian described prior to the album's release as a "crushed flower-power lament for the spoiled Eden her generation inherited". It serves as a condemnation for prior generations over their inaction on climate change. "Fallen Fruit" is also the only song on the album to feature an 808 drum machine in its production.

"Secrets from a Girl (Who’s Seen it All)" is an upbeat pop tune meant to take on the form of advice to a past version of oneself. Lorde considers "Secrets" to be a response to Pure Heroine's "Ribs," with the former reversing the primary chords of the latter's verses and the lyrics containing future wisdom wrought from lived experience; "This song is me in communication with another version of me, trying to send along the wisdom I’ve started to gather along the way." The British music group Eurythmics are credited as having inspired some of the melody, as well as Swedish singer-songwriter Robyn, who contributes a spoken-word interlude at the end of the song in the role of a "blissed-out flight attendant" coaching the listener through the confrontation of emotional turmoil.

Solar Power's B-side largely drops in tempo, starting with "The Man With the Axe," a love ballad which Lorde initially conceived as a poem after a party. She cites the minimal editing required to transform the original piece into a song as one of the record's greatest accomplishments. It remains the only song of the album Lorde has yet to perform live. The following track, "Dominoes," was recorded at Electric Lady Studios with the doors open, which contributed non-diegetic and unintended sounds from outside to the final production, including audible police sirens. The song has been described as a satirical exploration of tropes of people seeking wellness and utopia, with the unnamed man referenced in the lyrics of the song to be one such representation.

"Big Star" is a tribute to Lorde's dog, Pearl, whose death in late 2019 took a heavy toll on the singer and caused a reconfiguration of the album as a whole. Lorde began writing it on the piano with Pearl at her side; "I looked down and was like . . . 'You big dummy. You're never going to know that I'm writing this song about how much I love you.'" "Big Star" also features an interpolation of a lyric from the Melodrama song "Liability," with the latter's "Every perfect summer's eating me alive until you're gone" transformed into the former's "Every perfect summer's gotta say goodnight." Lorde had previously attributed the lyric as her favourite of her second album in a 2017 interview, described as a pillar of the record. In bringing the line back for Solar Power, she found it to be a thoughtful invocation of the line's original power, "while giving it new meaning for a new life stage."

The penultimate track and third Solar Power single, "Mood Ring," is a critique of wellness culture and the contrived methods of spiritual connectivity in the digital world. A "full satire" of material pursuits for emotional clarity, the lyrics contain references to popular new-age pseudoscientific practices, including crystal therapy, Sun Salutations, and astrology. Melodically, "Mood Ring" was meant to blend early-2000s musical trends with the psychedelic pop of the 1960s and 1970s. Solar Power's final track, "Oceanic Feeling," is Lorde's longest song to date, and one of the two songs on the album with O'Connor's exclusive writing credits (alongside the album's opener, "The Path"). Its title comes from Romain Rolland's concept of a feeling of oneness with the world. The song primarily consists of two chords, described as "moving back and forth," with lyrics that pay homage to Lorde's home, her loved ones, a past relationship with celebrity culture, and a future family of her own. New Zealand singer Marlon Williams contributed vocals to the production. In the song's concluding lines, Lorde alludes to "The Love Song of J. Alfred Prufrock" and muses about the imagery of robes and choirs she had previously song about in Pure Heroines "White Teeth Teens."

Release and promotion
In October 2020, Lorde urged her fans to vote in New Zealand's general election as well as the referendums on the personal use of cannabis and euthanasia, and added: "next year I'll give you something in return." The following month, she announced the release of Going South, a memoir documenting her visit to Antarctica in early 2019, and added that the book was "a sort of perfect precursor [...] in an abstract way" to her upcoming album. Lorde later revealed that the album title was inspired by the trip. On 25 May 2021, she was announced as a headliner for the 2022 Primavera Sound music festival, with the festival's website revealing that she "will emerge from her retirement with her third album." On 7 June, fans leaked the title and cover art for a single titled "Solar Power". Lorde consequently teased its release on her website alongside a message stating: "Arriving in 2021...Patience is a virtue." On 10 June, the song was leaked on dbree.org, a cloud storage website, and briefly made available on Apple Music and Tidal in select countries before being promptly taken down. It was officially released later that evening, coinciding with that day's solar eclipse. Lorde further confirmed that her upcoming third album would also be titled Solar Power in her newsletter. On 21 June, the track listing and release date for the album were revealed. Lorde began the Solar Power Tour on 3 April 2022, with concert dates in Oceania, North America, and Europe.

In a video titled "73 Questions with Lorde", published on 27 July 2021, Vogue interviewed Lorde about her fame, childhood dreams, and Solar Power. She discussed the album with The New York Times, in an article published on 12 August 2021.

Singles
"Solar Power", the title track, was released on 11 June 2021 as the lead single from Solar Power. The release was accompanied by a music video, directed by Lorde and Joel Kefali, which was released on the singer's official YouTube channel the same day. It charted in many countries, including a peak of number 2 on the New Zealand singles chart, number 14 on Australia's ARIA Singles, and number 64 on the U.S. Billboard Hot 100.

"Stoned at the Nail Salon" was released as the second single on 22 July. The song had minor chart placement in Australia, New Zealand and Ireland.

On 18 August 2021, "Mood Ring" was released as the third single from the album. A music video for the track premiered alongside the release. It reached the top 10 on the New Zealand Singles Chart and peaked at number 93 on the Billboard Global 200.

On 2 November 2021, "Fallen Fruit" was released as the fourth single from the album, coinciding with the release of the album's bonus tracks, "Helen of Troy" and "Hold No Grudge", to streaming services.

Lack of CD release
Despite versions of her two previous albums existing for the medium, Lorde did not release Solar Power via CD.  She stated that she does not want to "make something that would end up in a landfill in 2 years". Instead, an eco-friendly "music box" with handwritten notes, exclusive photographs, and a download card is available for those wanting a physical manifestation of the album in addition to the digital release. Lorde stated that, with the music box, she wanted to "create an environmentally kind, forward-thinking alternative to the CD" that would provide a high-quality download of the music similar to CD quality. Music trade publication Hits noted that the traditional CDs and their jewel cases are plastic materials that pollute the world's oceans. Vinyl LPs of the album were pressed, despite some researchers noting that vinyl records are also plastic products, and that "although digital audio files seem virtual, they rely on infrastructures of data storage, processing and transmission that have potentially higher greenhouse gas emissions than the petrochemical plastics used in the production of more obviously physical formats [...]"

Critical reception 

Solar Power polarised music critics upon release. On Metacritic, which assigns a normalised rating out of 100 based on reviews from several publications, Solar Power received an average score of 69, based on 27 critics, indicating "generally favourable reviews".

Spencer Kornhaber of The Atlantic hailed the album as a "near masterpiece", admiring its social critique and simplistic instrumentation, while NME critic Rhian Daly regarded it a beautifully produced album "that grows in quiet stature with every listen", aside wise lyrics. Mikael Wood of Los Angeles Times described Solar Power as a "low-key" album depicting Lorde's burdens of fame. Rolling Stone critic Brittany Spanos branded it a "smooth and beachy" record that has Lorde search for peace whilst meandering through her quarter-life crisis. Chris Willman of Variety found the album's lyrics compelling and its melodies concise. Observing influences from the Doors and the Mamas & the Papas, Lucy Harbron of Clash underlined Solar Power "isn't a fully sun-soaked album", but rather "sun-stroked", delivering her usual introspection under a "bright and hazy" tone. Lean Greenblatt of Entertainment Weekly said it has a subdued quality, purposely retiring the unfiltered vigour of her earlier albums, and delving into ease and "cool observation". Appreciating Lorde's vocals and "poetic" lyrics, The New Zealand Herald Lydia Burgham felt the album is a "slow burn" that abandons chart-friendly pop songs. Kate Solomon of i stated Solar Power gives up "dance anthems" for "warm, gentle, Laurel Canyon-inspired ruminations."

Some reviews were more critical of Solar Power. Paste reviewer Matt Mitchell wrote it is a "happy, charming juxtaposition" to the "sad-girl melancholia" of its predecessors, but its production by Antonoff is "not as rhapsodic" as his other works. Music journalist Alexis Petridis, writing for The Guardian, stated Solar Power sees Lorde flee celebrity life in favour of "homespun wisdom". He said the album sounds "undernourished" at its worst moments, but delivers overall. Sal Cinquemani of Slant opined Lorde rejects fame in the album, presenting herself as a "pop star in exile". He appreciated its acoustic composition, but felt it loses momentum in the second half. The Daily Telegraph Neil McCormick liked the album's lyrics, vocals, and the "utterly gorgeous" sound, but found it "underpowered" due to Lorde's new "over-privileged solipsist" perspectives. Bobby Olivier of Spin complimented Lorde's deft songwriting, but labelled Solar Power her "least vital project". In her Consequence review, Abby Jones called it a "collection of luminous psych-pop", citing static production and clumsy pop culture references as its flaws, nevertheless.

The Sydney Morning Herald Giselle Au-Nhien Nguyen noted flower child elements, and summarised, although Solar Power is "a perfectly fine record", it is an "anticlimax" that is lacking the "power and passion" of her past work. Alex Behan of Stuff wrote its songs have "understated elegance and charming harmonies", but its lyrics can be hackneyed and jarring. Stereogum critic James Rettig admired Lorde's voice and certain parts of the album which he thought were catchy, but thought the holistic concept was "muddy", lacking "deeper engagement", and sometimes "too laid back" and indistinct. Evening Standard David Smyth, The Independent Helen Brown, and David Cobbald of The Line of Best Fit gave negative reviews: Smyth felt the songs on Solar Power "seem to take pride in their lack of ambition", Brown dismissed it as a disappointing, tuneless "collection of heat haze hippy noodlings", deficit of memorable hooks, while Cobbald deemed it Lorde's fall from grace, saying "it's a tired old story, hearing about a rich white woman discovering crystals and then raving about the planet, peace, and love."

Commercial performance 
Two weeks before its release on 20 August 2021, Solar Power rose to number one on the Apple Music pre-add chart for the week dated 30 July to 5 August 2021.

In the United States, Solar Power entered the Billboard 200 chart at number five with 56,000 album-equivalent units moved, consisting of 34,000 album sales, and 22,000 units calculated from the 28.38 million on-demand streams the album earned in its opening week. Solar Power is Lorde's third top-five album on the chart, following Pure Heroine (number three in 2013) and Melodrama (number one in 2017). Hits criticised Billboard for not counting the sales of Solar Power "Music box", which are disc-less box sets containing a download card linked to a digital copy of the album, a 32-page booklet, a poster and some limited-edition goods, for the Billboard 200 chart; their own Hits Top 50 chart and the Rolling Stone Top 200 chart included the music box sales and placed Solar Power at number three in those charts. According to Billboard long-standing rule, a box set must contain a physical copy of the album. It also reached number one on the US Top Alternative Albums chart.

In Australia, Solar Power debuted at number one on the ARIA Albums Chart and stayed on it for 6 weeks. It also reached number one in New Zealand and the top ten in 14 countries, including the UK where it landed at number two. In Canada, it peaked at number six on the Canadian Albums Chart.

Companion EP

On 9 September 2021, Lorde released a five-song companion EP to Solar Power titled Te Ao Mārama, meaning "World of Light" in Māori. The EP features five re-recordings of songs from Solar Power sung in the Māori language. Although Lorde herself isn't Māori, she worked with Māori language experts, including Sir Tīmoti Kāretu, and collaborated with Kiwi singers Bic Runga and Marlon Williams to highlight "the long history of injustices that Maori language and culture has suffered and the inequities that persist today, specifically in New Zealand's music industry." Proceeds from the EP will be donated to the charities Forest and Bird and Te Hua Kawariki Charitable Trust.

Track listing

Notes
  signifies an additional producer

Personnel
Adapted from Tidal.

Musicians
 Lorde – vocals
 Jack Antonoff – bass, electric guitar (all tracks); acoustic guitar (1–6, 8, 11–14), drums (1–3, 6, 7, 11, 12), keyboards (1, 5–8, 11, 13), Mellotron (1, 4–6, 10), percussion (1, 2, 5, 12), piano (1, 3–5), programming (1, 5–8, 11, 12, 14), Wurlitzer electric piano (1, 5, 6), 12-string acoustic guitar (2, 5, 6)
 Clairo – background vocals (1, 2, 4, 5, 10, 11)
 Lawrence Arabia – background vocals (1, 4, 5, 10, 11)
 Marlon Williams – background vocals (1, 4, 5, 10–12)
 Phoebe Bridgers – background vocals (1, 2, 4, 5, 10, 11)
 Malay – bass (1, 5–7, 10, 13), acoustic guitar (7, 10, 14), programming (7), keyboards (10, 14), piano (14)
 Matt Chamberlain – drums (1–3, 6, 11–14), percussion (2, 12–14), programming (2, 11–14)
 Evan Smith – flute (1, 3, 5, 12–), saxophone (1–3, 5, 12–13), keyboards (13)
 Cole Kamen-Green – trumpet (2)
 Robyn – vocals (6)
 Bobby Hawk – violin (9, 10)

Technical
 Lorde – production
 Jack Antonoff – production (all tracks), mixing (4, 5, 7–10, 13)
 Malay – production (1, 7, 10, 14)
 Chris Gehringer – mastering
 Mark "Spike" Stent – mixing (1–3, 6, 11, 12, 14)
 Laura Sisk – mixing (4, 5, 7–10, 13)
 Will Quinnell – mastering assistance
 Matt Wolach – mixing assistance (2, 3, 5, 14)

Charts

Weekly charts

Year-end charts

Certifications and sales

Release history

Footnotes

References

External links
 

2021 albums
Lorde albums
Albums produced by Jack Antonoff
Albums produced by Lorde
Albums impacted by the COVID-19 pandemic
Albums about climate change
Folk-pop albums
Indie folk albums by New Zealand artists
Pop albums by New Zealand artists
Psychedelic folk albums
Cannabis music